Waiotahe (for a time, Waiotahi) is a beach, settlement and rural community in the Ōpōtiki District and Bay of Plenty Region of New Zealand's North Island, near the mouth and lowermost stretch of the Waiotahe River.

It includes a beach that attracts swimmers, surfers and anglers during the summer months, and river mouths that people fish from year-round. The beach is more dangerous during low tide due to stronger rips, but has natural hazards in all conditions.

Ōpōtiki District Council has banned vehicles from the mudflats of the Waiotahe estuary and a section of Waiotahe Beach. The council allows vehicles at other beaches, unlike most other New Zealand councils.

The town's official name reverted from Waiotahi back to the original Māori name Waiotahe in August 2015, following a decision by Land Information Minister Louise Upston, upheld by the New Zealand Geographic Board.

History

In July 2013, a couple in their 60s were attacked and held captive in their Waiotahe home by a former soldier who had spent the previous night sleeping rough near the town hall. The perpetrator fled the scene in their ute and was shot dead by police in Auckland. The couple were hospitalised for injuries to their hands and reported being traumatised by their ordeal.

The first case of Mycoplasma bovis in Bay of Plenty was recorded in a farm in Waiotahe in January 2020.

Demographics
The SA1 area is part of the Waiotahi statistical area.

The SA1 area had a population of 318 at the 2018 New Zealand census, an increase of 108 people (51.4%) since the 2013 census, and an increase of 162 people (103.8%) since the 2006 census. There were 114 households, comprising 165 males and 153 females, giving a sex ratio of 1.08 males per female. The median age was 47.0 years (compared with 37.4 years nationally), with 57 people (17.9%) aged under 15 years, 54 (17.0%) aged 15 to 29, 141 (44.3%) aged 30 to 64, and 69 (21.7%) aged 65 or older.

Ethnicities were 74.5% European/Pākehā, 35.8% Māori, 2.8% Pacific peoples, 5.7% Asian, and 1.9% other ethnicities. People may identify with more than one ethnicity.

Although some people chose not to answer the census's question about religious affiliation, 54.7% had no religion, 29.2% were Christian, 3.8% had Māori religious beliefs, 0.9% were Hindu and 1.9% had other religions.

Of those at least 15 years old, 42 (16.1%) people had a bachelor's or higher degree, and 51 (19.5%) people had no formal qualifications. The median income was $29,300, compared with $31,800 nationally. 27 people (10.3%) earned over $70,000 compared to 17.2% nationally. The employment status of those at least 15 was that 123 (47.1%) people were employed full-time, 39 (14.9%) were part-time, and 6 (2.3%) were unemployed.

Waiotahi statistical area

Waiotahi had a population of 1,518 at the 2018 New Zealand census, an increase of 150 people (11.0%) since the 2013 census, and an increase of 150 people (11.0%) since the 2006 census. There were 603 households, comprising 759 males and 756 females, giving a sex ratio of 1.0 males per female. The median age was 48.9 years (compared with 37.4 years nationally), with 267 people (17.6%) aged under 15 years, 225 (14.8%) aged 15 to 29, 690 (45.5%) aged 30 to 64, and 333 (21.9%) aged 65 or older.

Ethnicities were 74.5% European/Pākehā, 40.3% Māori, 1.8% Pacific peoples, 3.0% Asian, and 1.2% other ethnicities. People may identify with more than one ethnicity.

The percentage of people born overseas was 9.9, compared with 27.1% nationally.

Although some people chose not to answer the census's question about religious affiliation, 53.2% had no religion, 27.7% were Christian, 8.1% had Māori religious beliefs, 0.4% were Hindu, 0.2% were Muslim, 0.6% were Buddhist and 1.4% had other religions.

Of those at least 15 years old, 204 (16.3%) people had a bachelor's or higher degree, and 270 (21.6%) people had no formal qualifications. The median income was $28,900, compared with $31,800 nationally. 186 people (14.9%) earned over $70,000 compared to 17.2% nationally. The employment status of those at least 15 was that 576 (46.0%) people were employed full-time, 195 (15.6%) were part-time, and 69 (5.5%) were unemployed.

Education

The school opened in 1921.

Notable people
Kayaker Lisa Carrington was raised in the valley and went to the local school, where both of her parents are teachers. She regularly visits the area.

References

Ōpōtiki District
Populated places in the Bay of Plenty Region